The burnt-tailed barb (Balantiocheilos ambusticauda), also known as Siamese bala-shark, is a possibly extinct freshwater fish species from the family Cyprinidae. It is or was endemic to the Mae Klong and Chao Phraya River basins in Thailand.

Taxonomy and discovery 
The burnt-tailed barb was long considered as conspecific with the bala shark (Balantiocheilos melanopterus) until it was described as separate species in 2007. The holotype was collected by German ichthyologist Rolf Geisler (1925–2012) in February 1967 at Bung Boraphet, Nakhon Sawan province, Thailand. The material labelled as paratypes was collected by Rodolphe Meyer de Schauensee in 1936, by M. Harmand in 1883, and by Marie Firmin Bocourt in 1862.

Description
The burnt-tailed barb is closely related to the bala shark (B. melanopterus). It differs from its congener by a shorter snout, grooves which are posteriorly directed at rictus curved (vs. straight in the bala shark), and narrower black margins on the pelvic and anal fins (on distal third or less compared to the bala shark where the black margins are on distal half or more).

Distribution and status 
It is endemic to Thailand where known from the Mae Klong and Chao Phraya River basins. It has also been reported from the Mekong Basin in Vietnam, Cambodia and Laos, but confirmed records from this basin are lacking and this is not recognized as part of its range by the IUCN. The closely related B. melanopterus has been reported from the same rivers, but this is due to confusion with B. ambusticauda; the true native range of B. melanopterus is further south in the Malay Peninsula, Borneo and Sumatra. Large numbers of B. melanopterus are exported from Thailand for the aquarium trade, but these are all captive bred.

From Kittipong Jaruthanin's notes, who is Thai freshwater fish explorer said he found the last fish in nature habitat at one Bang Mot tangerine orchard's ditch, that drains from Chao Phraya River in Rat Burana district (now it becomes Thung Khru district), Bangkok's Thonburi side in 1986.

Despite surveys within its native range, it has not been recorded in more than three decades and is likely extinct. The IUCN rate it as critically endangered (rather than extinct) in the hope that a small undiscovered population remains. It has been speculated that capture for the aquarium trade was the reason for its drastic decline, but this is unsubstantiated. There has been extensive habitat destruction (pollution, drainage and dams) within its range and it is suspected it is sensitive to water quality.

References

Balantiocheilos
Taxa named by Maurice Kottelat
Fish described in 2007
Fish extinctions since 1500
Fish of Thailand